The 45th Infantry Division (45-ya Pekhotnaya Diviziya) was an infantry formation of the Russian Imperial Army.

Organization
It was part of the 16th Army Corps.
1st Brigade
177th Infantry Regiment
178th Infantry Regiment
2nd Brigade
179th Infantry Regiment
180th Infantry Regiment
45th Artillery Brigade

Commanders
1906-1907: Alexander Iosafovich Ievreinov
1908-1910: Pavel Savvich

References

Infantry divisions of the Russian Empire
Military units and formations disestablished in 1918